Lebanon Chapel AME Church is a historic African Methodist Episcopal church bounded by Young Street on the West and Middle Street on the North in Fairhope, Alabama.  It was built in 1923 and added to the National Register of Historic Places in 1988.

References

African Methodist Episcopal churches in Alabama
Churches on the National Register of Historic Places in Alabama
National Register of Historic Places in Baldwin County, Alabama
Churches completed in 1923
Churches in Baldwin County, Alabama
1923 establishments in Alabama